Danthonia californica is a species of grass known by the common name California oatgrass. This plant is native to two separate regions of the Americas, western North America from California to Saskatchewan, and Chile.

Description
Danthonia californica is a clumping erect perennial bunch grass with stems approaching a meter (3 feet) in height at maximum. The leaves are flat and short and may be hairy or hairless. The inflorescence holds one or more spikelets, each spikelet holding up to eight florets. This grass grows best in moist areas, generally in thin forests and meadows. Typical native grass associates in the far western North American coastal prairies are Festuca idahoensis, Deschampsia caespitosa, and Nassella pulchra.

See also
California coastal prairie
Native grasses of California

References

Notes
 C. Michael Hogan. 2009. "Purple Needlegrass (Nassella pulchra)" Globaltwitcher.com, ed. N. Stromberg 
 Jepson Manual. 1993. Jepson Manual Treatment: Danthonia californica

External links
USDA Plants Profile for Danthonia californica (California oatgrass)
 Calflora Database: Danthonia californica (California oatgrass)
Jepson Manual treatment of Danthonia californica
Grass Manual Treatment
Danthonia californica — UC Photos gallery

californica
Bunchgrasses of North America
Native grasses of California
Grasses of the United States
Grasses of Canada
Flora of the Western United States
Flora of Chile
Flora of the Cascade Range
Flora of the Klamath Mountains
Flora of the Sierra Nevada (United States)
Natural history of the California chaparral and woodlands
Natural history of the California Coast Ranges
Natural history of the San Francisco Bay Area
Flora without expected TNC conservation status